.bn is the Internet country code top-level domain (ccTLD) for Brunei. It is administered by BNNIC, a unit under the Authority for Info-communications Technology Industry. There are currently two registrars: Imagine and DST.

Second-level domains 
 .com.bn - commercial entities
 .edu.bn - educational institutions
 .gov.bn - government
 .net.bn - network providers
 .org.bn - non-profit organisations
 .bn - individuals

References

External links
 IANA .bn whois information

Communications in Brunei
Country code top-level domains
Computer-related introductions in 1994

sv:Toppdomän#B